In enzymology, a nucleoside deoxyribosyltransferase is an enzyme that catalyzes the chemical reaction

2-deoxy-D-ribosyl-base1 + base2  2-deoxy-D-ribosyl-base2 + base1

Thus, the two substrates of this enzyme are 2-deoxy-D-ribosyl-base1 and base2, whereas its two products are 2-deoxy-D-ribosyl-base2 and base1.

This enzyme belongs to the family of glycosyltransferases, specifically the pentosyltransferases.  The systematic name of this enzyme class is nucleoside:purine(pyrimidine) deoxy-D-ribosyltransferase. Other names in common use include purine(pyrimidine) nucleoside:purine(pyrimidine) deoxyribosyl, transferase, deoxyribose transferase, nucleoside trans-N-deoxyribosylase, trans-deoxyribosylase, trans-N-deoxyribosylase, trans-N-glycosidase, nucleoside deoxyribosyltransferase I (purine nucleoside:purine, deoxyribosyltransferase: strictly specific for transfer between, purine bases), nucleoside deoxyribosyltransferase II [purine(pyrimidine), and nucleoside:purine(pyrimidine) deoxyribosyltransferase].  This enzyme participates in pyrimidine metabolism.

Structural studies

References

 
 
 

EC 2.4.2
Enzymes of known structure